Geometric phase analysis is a method of digital signal processing used to determine crystallographic quantities such as d-spacing or strain from high-resolution transmission electron microscope images.  The analysis needs to be performed using specialized computer program.

Principle 

In geometric phase analysis, crystallographic quantities are not determined at one particular point of the input image. Instead, they are quantified across the whole image resulting in a two-dimensional map of given quantity. Quantities which can be mapped with geometric phase analysis include interplanar distances (d-spacing), strain tensor and displacement vector.

Since the calculations are performed in frequential domain, the input image of crystal lattice must be transformed into frequential representation using Fourier transform. From mathematical point of view, the frequential image is a complex matrix with the size equal to the original image. From crystallographic point of view, it can be seen as an artificial  diffraction pattern or reciprocal image as it depicts reciprocal lattice. In this representation, the intensity peaks (or power peaks) correspond to the crystallographic planes depicted in the original image.

Due to the complex nature of the frequential image, it can be used to calculate amplitude and phase. Together with a vector of one crystallographic plane depicted in the image, the amplitude and phase can be used to generate a 2D map of d-spacing. If two vectors of non-parallel planes are known, the method can be used to generate maps of strain and displacement.

Software 

In order to perform geometric phase analysis, a computer tool is needed. Firstly, because manual evaluation of transforms between spatial and frequential domain would be highly impractical. Secondly, a vector of crystallographic plane is an important input parameter and the analysis is sensitive to the accuracy of its localization. Therefore the accuracy and repeatability of the analysis can be increased by an automated localization of diffraction spots.

The required functionalities are available in crystallographic suite CrysTBox. It offers an interactive implementation geometric phase analysis called  gpaGUI. Within gpaGUI, it is possible to index the diffraction spots and localize them with sub-pixel precision using an automated tool  diffractGUI.

See also 
 High-resolution transmission electron microscopy
 Fourier transform
 Transmission electron microscope
 CrysTBox

References

Crystallography
Electron microscopy
Geometric measurement
Digital signal processing
Applied mathematics